Alexandr Trifonov (born March 13, 1986) is a Kazakh biathlete.

He competed in the 2010 Winter Olympics for Kazakhstan. His best finish was 18th, as part of the Kazakh relay team. He also finished 69th in the individual.

As of February 2013, his best performance at the Biathlon World Championships, is 15th, in the 2012 men's relay. His best individual performance in a World Championships is 80th, in the 2012 sprint.

As of February 2013, his best Biathlon World Cup finish is 15th, achieved in two men's relay events. His best individual finish is 53rd, in the 2010/11 sprint race at Östersund.

References 

1986 births
Living people
People from Ridder, Kazakhstan
Biathletes at the 2010 Winter Olympics
Biathletes at the 2014 Winter Olympics
Kazakhstani male biathletes
Olympic biathletes of Kazakhstan
Asian Games medalists in biathlon
Biathletes at the 2007 Asian Winter Games
Asian Games bronze medalists for Kazakhstan
Medalists at the 2007 Asian Winter Games
21st-century Kazakhstani people